
This is a list of mayors of Bergen, Norway.

Since 2000, the city is governed by a city council (byråd) based on the principle of parliamentarism. This change led to the real political power in the city being transferred from the mayor to the leader of the city council. , the leader of the city council is Monica Mæland.

19th century
 1. 1837–1838: Carsten B. Conradi
 2. 1839–1841: Hans J. C. Aall
 3. 1842: Georg H. Houge
 4. 1843–1844: Hans J. C. Aall
 5. 1845: Hans Holmboe
 6. 1846: Hans J. C. Aall
 7. 1847: Hans Holmboe
 8. 1848: Joachim J. M. Ege
 9. 1849–1850: Hans Holmboe
 10. 1851: Joachim J. M. Ege
 11. 1852–1853: Paul M. Smit
 12. 1854: Ole Bøgh
 13. 1855–1856: Paul M. Smit
 14. 1857: Ole Bøgh
 15. 1858–1859: Paul M. Smit
 16. 1860: Boe N. Knap
 17. 1861: Joachim J. M. Ege
 18. 1862: Jørgen B. Faye
 19. 1863–1864: Paul M. Smit
 20. 1865–1866: Jacob A. Michelsen
 21. 1867–1868: Ivar Chr. S. Geelmuyden
 22. 1869–1872: Morten Beyer
 23. 1873–1875: Ivar Chr. S. Geelmuyden
 24. 1876–1878: Jacob A. Michelsen
 25. 1879: Gerhard Chr. Krogh
 26. 1880–1881: Christian A. Irgens
 27. 1882: Knud A. Angell
 28. 1883–1885: Bendix E. R. Bendixen (V)
 29. 1886–1887: Johan G. T. Ameln (V)
 30. 1888–1890: John Theodor Lund (V)
 31. 1891: Gerhard. Chr. Krogh (V)
 32. 1892–1893: Christian Michelsen (H)
 33. 1894: Klaus Hanssen (V)
 34. 1895–1898: Christian Michelsen (V)
 35. 1899–1901: Christian M. Kahrs (V)

20th century
 36. 1902–1906: Johan Ludwig Mowinckel (V)
 37. 1907–1910: Carl V. E. Geelmuyden (V)
 38. 1911–1913: Johan Ludwig Mowinckel (V)
 39. 1914–1916: Carl V. E. Geelmuyden (V)
 40. 1917: Einar Greve (V)
 41. 1918–1919: Kristian Hopp (A)
 42. 1920–1922: Henrik Ameln (H)
 43. 1923–1924: Hans Kristian Seip (Avholdspartiet)
 44. 1925: Julius Moe-Nilsen (H + Fr.V)
 45. 1926–1932: Ragnvald J. Lorentzen (H + Fr.V + Huseierpartiet)
 46. 1932–1934: Leif M. Michelsen (V)
 47. 1935–1942: Asbjørn Stensaker (H)
 48. 1945: Asbjørn Stensaker (H)
 49. 1945–1953: Nils Handal (A)
 50. 1953–1960: Knut Tjønneland (A)
 51. 1960–1963: August D. Michelsen (H)
 52. 1964–1969: Harry Hansen (A)
 53. 1969–1971: Ragnar Juell Morken (A)
 54. 1972–1973: Ole Myrvoll (DLF)
 55. 1973–1983: Eilert Eilertsen (H)
 56. 1984–1985: Arne Næss (KrF)
 57. 1986–1987: Henrik J. Lisæth (H)
 58. 1988–1989: Arne Næss (KrF)
 59. 1989–1995: Bengt Martin Olsen (A)
 60. 1995–1999: Ingmar Ljones (KrF)
 61. 1999–2000: Anne-Grete Strøm-Erichsen (A)

21st century
 62. 2000–2001: Ingmar Ljones (KrF)
 63. 2001–2003: Kristian Helland (KrF)
 64. 2003–2007: Herman Friele (H)
 65. 2007–2011: Gunnar Bakke (FrP)
 66. 2011-2015: Trude Drevland (H)
 67. 2015-present: Marte Mjøs Persen (A)

References
 

Bergen